Emre Lale (born 14 October 1993) is a Turkish badminton player. Lale was born in Bursa, and trained at the A.B.B. EGO SPOR Kulübü  As a junior player, he represented his country competed at the 2010 Summer Youth Olympics in Singapore. In 2011, he won a bronze medal at the European Junior Championships in the boys' singles event. Lale won his first senior international title at the Iraq International in the men's singles event. He competed at the 2013 and 2018 Mediterranean Games, also at the 2019 European Games.

Achievements

Mediterranean Games 
Men's singles

European Junior Championships 
Boys' singles

BWF International Challenge/Series 
Men's singles

  BWF International Challenge tournament
  BWF International Series tournament
  BWF Future Series tournament

References

External links 
 

Living people
1993 births
Sportspeople from Bursa
Turkish male badminton players
Badminton players at the 2010 Summer Youth Olympics
Badminton players at the 2019 European Games
European Games competitors for Turkey
Competitors at the 2013 Mediterranean Games
Competitors at the 2018 Mediterranean Games
Competitors at the 2022 Mediterranean Games
Mediterranean Games bronze medalists for Turkey
Mediterranean Games medalists in badminton